Suwâld is a village in Tytsjerksteradiel municipality in the province of Friesland, the Netherlands. It had a population of around 652 in January 2017.

The village has a solar powered ferry for transporting pedestrians and bicycles called Schalkediep.

History 
The village was first mentioned in 1481 as Suwald, and means "southern forest". Suwâld is located on an elongated narrow sandy ridge near the Wijde Ee river. It developed in the middle ages. The Dutch Reformed church probably dates from the 12th century. The tower collapsed in 1828, and in 1889 a new tower was added to the church.

Suwâld was home to 263 people in 1840.

Population
 1954 - 672
 1959 - 613
 1964 - 616
 1969 - 589
 1973 - 544
 2006 - 622

Gallery

References

Populated places in Friesland
Tytsjerksteradiel